Grigorije "Grigor" Vitez (15 February 1911 – 23 November 1966) was a Yugoslav writer and translator. He is best remembered as the author of children's poetry and other forms of literature for children and youth.

Biography
He was born to a Serb family from north Dalmatia, which had previously used the surname Alavanja. One of his ancestors held the honorary title of knight, which became the family surname.

He went to elementary school in Okučani and to a gymnasium in Nova Gradiška. As a high school student he started collection folk poetry of the area. Vitez went on to finish the state school for teachers.

In 1933, he joined the Communists and fought in the World War II as a member of the Yugoslav Partisans. After the World War II, he worked in the Ministry of Education and as editor for Mladost publishing house, in charge for children's and youth edition. Vitez was also working for the Novo pokoljenje publishing company. He edited thirteen publishing series for children and youth.

When Borislav Pekić authored an anthology of children's poetry, Vitez criticised him because, even though Serbian literature for children is de facto richer than Croatian, he should have included more poets from Croatia.

Vitez was a prolific translator, mostly from Russian. He translated poems by Alexander Pushkin, Mikhail Lermontov, Boris Pasternak, Sergei Yesenin, Vladimir Mayakovsky, Eduard Bagritsky, Vera Inber, Alexey Surkov, Mikhail Golodny, Stepan Shchipachev, Aleksandr Tvardovsky etc., and prose from the works of Leo Tolstoy, Anton Chekhov, Maxim Gorky and Aleksey Nikolayevich Tolstoy. He also translated Pavel Golia, Fran Levstik, Srečko Kosovel, Matjaž Klopčič, Alojz Gradnik, Cene Vipotnik, Tone Pavček, Janez Menart and other Slovenian poets. Alongside Russian and Slovenian he translated works from French language.

He held a correspondence with Nobel Prize winning writer Boris Pasternak. Vitez died at the age of 55 and was buried in his hometown.

Prosvjeta published his selected works in 2011, marking 100 years of his birth.

Most of the works by Serbian writers was removed from the textbooks and schools from Croatia during and after the Croatian War of Independence, but Vitez's works was continuously part of the school curriculum in Croatia.

Grigor Vitez Award for literature written for children was established in 1967. It is the oldest awards of its kind in modern-day Croatia.

He was awarded the Yugoslav Order of Labour, Order of the Republic and Award of the city of Zagreb.

Schools in Osijek, Sveti Ivan Žabno, Poljana and Zagreb are named after him, as well as the local library in Gornji Bogićevci.

Works
 San boraca u zoru, Nakl. Navod Hrvatske, Zagreb, 1948
 Pjesme, Zora Državno izdavačko poduzeće Hrvatske, Zagreb, 1950
 Naoružane ruže, Kultura,  Zagreb, 1955
 Vesele zamke, Mladost, Zagreb, 1955
 Prepelica, Prosvjeta, Zagreb, 1956
 Lirika o Slavoniji, urednik, Slavonija danas, Osijek, 1956
 Povjerenje životu, Narodna prosvjeta, Sarajevo, 1957
 Sto vukova, i druge pjesme za djecu, "Svjetlost", Sarajevo, 1957
 Perzijske bajke, Mladost, Zagreb, 1958.
 Kad bi drveće hodalo, Mladost, Zagreb, 1959
 Kao lišće i trava: pjesme, Matica hrvatska, Zagreb, 1960
 Maksimir, Mladost, Zagreb, 1960
 Iza brda plava: izbor pjesama za djecu, Matica hrvatska, Zagreb, 1961
 Jednog jutra u gaju, editor, 1961
 Hvatajte lopova, "Svjetlost", Sarajevo, 1964
 Gdje priče rastu, Mladost, Zagreb, 1965. 
 Zekina kuća, Mladost, Zagreb, 1965
 Igra se nastavlja, posthumous, 1967
 Pjesme četiri vjetra, editor, 1968
  Nevidljive ptice, Mozaik knjiga, 2002

References

Serbian writers
Croatian writers
20th-century Serbian people
20th-century Croatian people
1911 births
1966 deaths
People from Brod-Posavina County
Serbs of Croatia